The Tirunetuntantakam is a Tamil Hindu work of literature authored by Tirumangai Alvar, one of the twelve poet-saints of Sri Vaishnavism. The work is a part of a compendium of hymns called the Naalayira Divya Prabandham. The Tirunetuntantakam consists of 30 hymns. It is written in a Tamil poetic meter known as the tāṇṭakam, in which each line of a stanza consists of more than 26 syllables, composed of quatrains of equal length.

Hymns 
Tirumangai Alvar takes the role of a nayaki (a female consort) who pines for the nayaka (God) in the hymns of this work. 

In hymns 13 and 14, the poet-saint teaches a parrot to hail the epithets of Vishnu, and honours the bird by offering her folded palms in veneration.
The third hymn of the Tirunetuntantakam describes the Kurma incarnation of Vishnu during the Samudra Manthana:

The fourth hymn proclaims Vishnu's supremacy over other deities, celestial objects, and the five elements:

Philosophy 
The hymns of the Tirunetuntantakam have been interpreted to describe the three key principles of the Vishishtadvaita philosophy: tattva (knowledge of the entities of jiva, ajiva, and ishvara), hita (achieving realisation through bhakti and prapatti), and purushartha (the goal of moksha). It also references the five Agamic forms of Vishnu that are featured in the Pancharatra Agama: Para, the form of Vishnu in Vaikuntha, the four Vyuhas and the Upavyuhas, Vibhava, Antaryami, the form of the deity who pervades all of existence, and Archa, the form of the deity venerated as murtis.

See also 

 Tiruvelukkutrirukkai
 Tirukkuruntantakam
 Periya Tirumoli

References 

Naalayira Divya Prabandham

External links 
Tirunetuntantakam (Tamil)
Vaishnava texts
Sri Vaishnavism
Tamil Hindu literature